A Fair Impostor is a 1909 novel by the British writer Charles Garvice. It was adapted into a 1916 film of the same title directed by Alexander Butler.

References

Bibliography
 Low, Rachael. The History of British Film, Volume III: 1914-1918. Routledge, 1997.

1909 British novels
Novels by Charles Garvice
British novels adapted into films